George Henry Bennett (18508 September 1908) was a brewer and a politician.

Bennett was born in Buckie, Banffshire, Scotland. His family emigrated to Australia in 1855.

He managed the Victoria Sugar Co. and later, with a partner, owned Excelsior Brewery, a porterbrewing business. Excelsior Brewery operated in Collingwood and Richmond. As larger brewers took over the local market, Excelsior moved to manufacturing aerated waters and cordials at Richmond. He took over sole control of the company from August 1883.

In 1880 Bennett was elected to the Richmond town council and, in turn, was elected Mayor in 1886. As Mayor he was also elected as the second President of the fledgling Richmond Football Club, commencing with the 1887 season.  He held this post for the next twenty-two years until his death.  During his tenure the club won its first two Victorian Football Association premierships and gained admittance to the more powerful Victorian Football League.

A liberal and protectionist, he was elected to the seat of Richmond in the Victorian Legislative Assembly in 1889 and was then re-elected at the next seven elections.

Bennett died of pneumonia at his home in Richmond, Victoria, Australia, on 8 September 1908.  He was survived by his wife, Jessie, and two of their three daughters.

His bust stands outside the Richmond Town Hall.

References
Chris McConville. (1979). ' Bennett, George Henry (1850 - 1908)', Australian Dictionary of Biography, Volume 7, Melbourne University Press
Hansen B: Tigerland - Richmond Past Players and Officials Assoc, Melbourne 1989

1850 births
1908 deaths
People from Buckie
Richmond Football Club administrators
Scottish emigrants to colonial Australia
19th-century Australian politicians
People from Richmond, Victoria